JT Storage, Inc. (also known as JTS Corporation) was a maker of inexpensive IDE hard drives for personal computers based in San Jose, California. It was founded in 1994 by "Jugi" Tandon—the inventor of the double-sided floppy disk drive and founder of Tandon Corporation—and Tom Mitchell, a co-founder of Seagate and former president and Chief Operating Officer of both Seagate and Conner Peripherals.

The company later reverse-merged with Jack Tramiel's Atari Corporation in 1996, sold all Atari assets to Hasbro Interactive in 1998 and was finally declared bankrupt in 1999.

History

Early years and products

JTS initially focused on a new 3" form-factor drive for laptops. The 3" form factor allowed a larger drive capacity for laptops with the existing technology. Compaq was actively engaged in qualifying these drives and built several laptops with this form factor drive. Lack of a second source was a major obstacle for this new form factor to gain a foothold; JTS licensed the form factor to Western Digital to attempt to remedy this problem. Eventually, as 2.5" drives became cheaper to build, interest in the 3" form factor waned, and JTS and WD stopped the project in 1998.

JTS by then had become a source of cheap, medium-performance 3.5" drives with 5400 RPM spindles. The drives, produced in a factory in India (the factory was in the Madras Export Processing Zone in the suburbs of the Southern Indian city of Madras, now known as Chennai), were known for poor reliability. Failure rates were very high and quality control was inconsistent: good drives were very good, still running after 5 years, whereas bad drives almost always failed within a few weeks. Because of their low-tier reputation, JTS drives were rare in brand-name PCs and most frequently turned up in home-built and whitebox PCs. Product lines included Palladium and Champion internal IDE hard drives.

The basic design of their drives was done by Kalok for TEAC in the early 1990s. TEAC used the design as part of a removable HDD system, which was also sold under the Kalok name. After Kalok failed in 1994, JTS hired its founder as their chief technical officer, and licensed the patents involved from TEAC and Pont Peripherals.

Merger with Atari Corporation and demise

On February 13, 1996, JTS announced a reverse merger with former video game and home computer manufacturer, Atari Corporation. It was primarily a marriage of convenience; JTS had products but little cashflow, while Atari had money, primarily from a series of successful lawsuits earlier in the decade followed by good investments. However, with the failure of its Jaguar game console, losses mounting, and no other products to sell, Atari expected to run out of money within two years. Within a few months of the merger becoming official on July 30, and all former Atari employees were either dismissed or relocated to JTS's headquarters. Atari's remaining inventory of Jaguar products proved difficult to get rid of, even at liquidation prices, and the bulk of them remained in stock months after the merger until finally being moved out to a private liquidator on December 23, 1996.

Even with the cash infusion from Atari, JTS quickly ran out of money. On March 13, 1998, JTS sold the Atari name and assets to Hasbro Interactive for $5 million, less than a fifth of what Warner Communications had paid 22 years earlier. Later that year, on December 11, JTS filed for Chapter 11 bankruptcy protection.

However, on January 28, 1999, the company was closed down for good when its filing was ultimately converted into involuntary Chapter 7 liquidation by the bankruptcy courts.

References

External links 

American companies established in 1994
American companies disestablished in 1999
Companies that filed for Chapter 11 bankruptcy in 1998
Companies that have filed for Chapter 7 bankruptcy
Computer companies established in 1994
Computer companies disestablished in 1999
Computer storage companies
Defunct companies based in the San Francisco Bay Area
Defunct computer companies of the United States
Manufacturing companies based in San Jose, California